Vitaliy Vladimirovich Sidorov (born 6 March 1990) is a Russian former professional football player.

Club career 

Vitaliy started to play football from childhood in his home town with his local club FC Sibir where he showed considerable promise. His professional career began with FC Sibir in 2005 when he signed a professional contract with the club. He continued to play with FC Sibir for five seasons.

In 2010, Sidorov received an offer to come to a professional football club in Israel. The club FC Hapoel Ramat Gan Israel participated in the Israeli Premier League. After that Vitaliy was invited to a professional football club in Moldova FC Olimpia Balti which participates in the Moldavian Premier League. Vitaliy performed well with FC Olimpia scoring a goal on 85 minutes against Dacia in the semifinal of the Moldova Cup, and helping his team FC Olimpia advance to the Cup final in Moldova in 2011.

In 2012, Vitaliy received an offer to come to United States. He spent a pre-season training camp with the professional football club participating in the MLS. Immediately thereafter Vitaliy received an offer from a Canadian professional soccer club Kingston FC, which plays in the Canadian Soccer League. He reached a mutual agreement with Kingston FC and signed a contract with the team midway through the 2012 CSL season.

In 2013 Vitaliy Sidorov signed a contract with BEC Tero Sasana F.C. in Thailand Premier League.

Due to injury in 2015 Sidorov has ended his professional player career.Vitaliy Sidorov.

Career statistics

References

External links 
 Kingston FC Signs first Russian player
 Growth Potential is there for Kingston FC
 FC Olimpia approaching to Final National Cup
 FC Olimpia in Italy
 V.Sidorov FootballDatabase

1990 births
Living people
Russian footballers
Russian Premier League players
FC Sibir Novosibirsk players
Kingston FC players
Canadian Soccer League (1998–present) players
Association football midfielders